Kelvindale railway station is a railway station that serves the Kelvindale suburb of Glasgow, Scotland. It was opened on 26 September 2005 by Bill Butler, the then Member of Parliament in the Scottish Parliament and Councillor Alistair Watson. A bronze plaque records the event.

Services are provided by ScotRail as part of the SPT network.

History

Passenger services were eventually introduced by the NBR in 1887, but these ceased in 1903. Freight to the docks ended in 1968, but the route was still regularly used for freight access to various goods depots, shipyards & engineering plants (plus occasional passenger diversions) until 1980, when a signal box fire put the junction at Maryhill Park out of use and eventually led to the closure of the line between Maryhill & Anniesland.

The track was lifted in 1987/8, but the formation was kept intact and this made the eventual reinstatement of the line as part of the  branch reopening project in 2005. A station to serve the Kelvindale & Dawsholm area was proposed by SPT as part of the scheme (the station was originally to be called Dawsholm, but later changed to its present name) – though it wasn't ready in time for the reopening of the  branch in April 2005, services subsequently began calling later that year.

Service 

With the timetable revision starting on 18 May 2014, a limited hourly Sunday service now operates on this route.

References

External links 
 for Kelvindale railway station
Railscot - Larkhall Reopening Scheme

Railway stations in Glasgow
Railway stations opened by Network Rail
Railway stations in Great Britain opened in 2005
SPT railway stations
Railway stations served by ScotRail
2005 establishments in Scotland